Montfort College of Performing Arts is a stage school in Cork City in the Republic of Ireland; it specialises in vocal technique, dance classes, singing classes, drama and musical theatre.

History
Montforts was established in 1958 by Eileen Nolan, who had previously founded a group called the "Montfort Singers" which performed at the "Cork Opera House". Its success inspired her to found the school. The Montfort College of Performing Arts' most recent productions were "Camp Rock" - Everyman Palace Theatre, "Cinderella" - Firkin Crane, Broadway Kidz - Half-Moon Theatre, "Joseph & the Amazing Technicolour Dreamcoat" - Everyman Palace Theatre, "Snow White & The Seven Dwarves" - Firkin Crane, "Broadway Kidz" (Second year) - Half Moon Theatre & "The Little Mermaid" - Everyman Palace Theatre.

Notable alumni

Professional theatre
Michael McCarthy – star of Les Misérables in the West End and on Broadway
Elaine Symons – Elaine - working in the National Theatre and appeared in many TV shows and movies.
Frank Twomey – presenter of Bosco for many years. Now presenting Cork City and Culture on TV

Musical directors
Cathal Dunne

References

Education in Cork (city)
Drama schools in Ireland
Educational institutions established in 1958
Schools of the performing arts
1958 establishments in Ireland